The 2011 Torneio Internacional Cidade de São Paulo (also known as the 2011 International Tournament of São Paulo) was the third edition of the Torneio Internacional Cidade de São Paulo de Futebol Feminino, an invitational women's football tournament held annually in Brazil. It began on 8 December and ended on 18 December 2011.

Format
The four invited teams were in. In the first phase, the teams played each other within the group in a single round. The two teams with the most points earned in the respective group, were qualified for the next phase.

In the final stage, the first and second teams placed in Group. Played only one match, becoming the champion, the winner team. If the match ends in a tie, will be considered champion, the team with the best campaign in the first phase.

The third and fourth teams placed in the group. Played in one game, becoming the third-placed, the winner team. If the match ends in a tie, will be considered champion, the team with the best campaign in the first phase.

Teams
Listed are the confirmed teams.

Group stage
All times are local

Group A

Knockout stage

Third place match

Final

Final results

Goalscorers

4 goals
 Érika

3 goals
 Pernille Harder

1 goal

 Aline
 Cristiane
 Ester
 Fabiana
 Marta
 Rosana
 Thaís Guedes
 Kristine Pedersen
 Line Roddik Hansen
 Sanne Troelsgaard Nielsen
 Sofie Junge Pedersen
 Alice Parisi
 Melania Gabbiadini
 Elisabetta Tona

References

External links
Official Site (in Portuguese)

2011
2011 in women's association football
2011 in Brazilian women's football
2011–12 in Italian women's football
2011–12 in Danish women's football
2011 in Chilean football